Synthol may refer to:

Synthol (bodybuilding), a site enhancement oil (SEO), a body-building substance
Synthol (mouthwash), a French brand of liquid painkiller/mouthwash now owned by GlaxoSmithKline